Jada Myii Hart (born 19 March 1998) is an American tennis player.

Hart graduated from Riverside Virtual School in 2016 and is currently attending UCLA.
Jada Hart is a four time all-American at UCLA. There have been only eight other Bruins to achieve that prestigious accomplishment. She also went on to achieve her Master's degree during her enrollment.

Hart made her Grand Slam main-draw debut at the 2016 US Open in the doubles event, partnering with Ena Shibahara. Later in the tournament, the pair won the girls' doubles title.

Grand Slam doubles performance timeline

ITF Circuit finals

Doubles: 4 (2 title, 2 runner-ups)

Junior Grand Slam finals

Girls' doubles

External links
 
 

1998 births
Living people
American female tennis players
US Open (tennis) junior champions
Grand Slam (tennis) champions in girls' doubles
Universiade medalists in tennis
Universiade bronze medalists for the United States
Medalists at the 2017 Summer Universiade
21st-century American women
Tennis people from California
UCLA Bruins women's tennis players